Marcus Fulvius Flaccus was the name of several Romans, including:

 Marcus Fulvius Flaccus (consul 264 BC)
 Marcus Fulvius Flaccus (consul 125 BC)

See also
 Fulvius or Fulvia gens, for other members of the gens
 Flaccus, on the cognomen